Bacchisa testacea is a species of beetle in the family Cerambycidae. It was described by J. Thomson in 1857. It is known from Borneo and Java.

References

T
Beetles described in 1857